Eleemosynary may refer to:

Eleemosynary, relating to charity or the giving of alms
Eleemosynary (play), by Lee Blessing (1985)